Isura Devapriya is a Sri Lankan politician who is the current Chief Minister of the Western Province. He was appointed to the position on 8 September 2015, following the election of his predecessor, Prasanna Ranatunga, to parliament.

References

Chief Ministers of Western Province, Sri Lanka
Living people
Year of birth missing (living people)
Alumni of Ananda Sastralaya, Kotte